Wyse was an American computer company.

Wyse may refer to:

 John Wyse (died after 1499), Irish judge
 John Wyse (actor) (1904–1989)
 Kenneth Wyse, Canadian drag queen
 Lois Wyse (1926–2007), author and cofounder of Wyse Advertising
 Peter Wyse Jackson (born 1955), botanist
 Thomas Wyse (1791–1862), diplomat
 Wyse (band), Japanese group
 WYSE, a sports talk radio station licensed to Canton, North Carolina

See also

 Wyses Corner, Nova Scotia
 Worldwide Youth in Science and Engineering (WYSE)